The 2019–20 Oman Pentangular Series was a Twenty20 International (T20I) cricket tournament, that was held in Oman in October 2019. Originally scheduled to be played between four teams, it was increased to five. The series was played between Hong Kong, Ireland, Nepal, the Netherlands and hosts Oman ahead of the 2019 ICC Men's T20 World Cup Qualifier tournament in the United Arab Emirates. All the matches were played at the Al Amerat Cricket Stadium in Muscat.

In September 2019, when Cricket Hong Kong announced their squad, Anshuman Rath was not included in the side, after quitting the national team to pursue a career in India. Following Rath's announcement to quit playing for the Hong Kong team, Babar Hayat then declared that he was no longer available to play for Hong Kong. Brothers Tanveer Ahmed and Ehsan Nawaz also withdrew themselves for selection.

Hosts Oman won the tournament, after they won all four of their matches, with Ireland finishing as the runners-up.

Squads

Points table

Fixtures

References

External links
 Series home at ESPN Cricinfo

2019 in Dutch cricket
2019 in Omani sport
International cricket competitions in 2019–20
International cricket competitions in Oman
Oman Pentangular